Aurora Pro Patria 1919, commonly referred to as Pro Patria, is an Italian football club based in Busto Arsizio, Lombardy. It currently plays in Serie C. 
In Latin, Pro Patria translates to "For the Fatherland".

History

Pro Patria et Libertate
The club was founded in 1919.

The club has played in Serie A fourteen times mostly during the first half of the 20th century, the last time being in 1955–56.

In 1995 the club, then officially named Pro Patria et Libertate, was disqualified from Serie D.

Pro Patria Gallaratese G.B.
The Gallaratese of Gallarate was admitted to Serie C2, in order to keep the historical brand alive, it changed its name to Pro Patria Gallaratese G.B. (G.B. being for Gallarate and Busto Arsizio, respectively): the club is considered the direct heir of Pro Patria et Libertate.

The club played in the fourth tier until 2002, when the club won promotion to Serie C1 via the playoffs. In 2008 the club was relegated to Serie C2 after losing in the playoffs to Hellas Verona by 2–1 on aggregate, but was later readmitted to Lega Pro Prima Divisione to fill a vacancy.

In June 2008, a club takeover was completed and ambitious plans for a return to Serie B were unveiled. However, impressive performances in the Lega Pro Prima Divisione 2008–09 were accompanied by financial troubles, which led to the club being declared insolvent by the local magistrate in April 2009 due to excessive financial debts. The club's president was later arrested and has to stand trial on charges related to the bankruptcy. The drive to Serie B came to nothing for the team in a most bitter way; badly losing the home return match of their playoff final against Padova, who played with 10 men after an early sending off.

Aurora Pro Patria 1919
On 27 June 2009 Aurora Pro Patria 1919, owned by the Tesoro family, construction businessmen from Apulia, acquired the sports title from the liquidator of the old company.

In the season 2009–10 it was relegated to Lega Pro Seconda Divisione. In the 2012–13 season it was promoted to Lega Pro Prima Divisione. In the 2014–15 season it was relegated to Serie D, but it was readmitted to Lega Pro to fill vacancies. However, a second consecutive relegation to Serie D brought the club down to the amateur levels of Italian football.
Pro Patria is one of the most important football club in the Varese area but due to the recent performances on the pitch, the team has never been able to reach the same level of fame as before.

2013 racism incident
On 3 January 2013, the club was hosting A.C. Milan in a friendly match, when a small group of people in the crowd aimed abusive chants at black A.C. Milan players, including M'Baye Niang, Urby Emanuelson, Sulley Muntari and Kevin-Prince Boateng. Boateng reacted angrily, kicking the ball into the stands, before the entire Milan team walked off the field in protest, causing the game to be abandoned. The final verdict on the incident, however, stated that the punishment handed down was not in reference to racism allegations. Pro Patria was subsequently forced to play one game behind closed doors because of this incident.

Players

Current squad

Out on loan

Notable former players

  Ferdinando Piro

Honours
 Serie B
 Winners: 1946–47 (Group A)

 Serie D
 Winners: 2017–18

References

External links
Official website

Football clubs in Lombardy
Busto Arsizio
Association football clubs established in 1919
Italian football First Division clubs
Serie A clubs
Serie B clubs
Serie C clubs
1919 establishments in Italy